A hydroxysteroid is a molecule derived from a steroid with a hydrogen replaced with a hydroxy group. When the hydroxy group is specifically at the C3 position, hydroxysteroids are referred to as sterols, with an example being cholesterol.

See also
 Hydroxysteroid dehydrogenase
 Ketosteroid

External links
 

Alcohols
Steroids